Edwin Peel Reay (5 August 1914 – 4 February 1992) was an English professional footballer who played as a full back in the Football League for Queens Park Rangers. After his retirement as a player, he became assistant trainer at the club.

Career statistics

References 

English footballers
English Football League players
Brentford F.C. wartime guest players
Queens Park Rangers F.C. players
1914 births
1992 deaths
Sportspeople from Tynemouth
Footballers from Tyne and Wear
Association football fullbacks
Washington Colliery F.C. players
Ferryhill Athletic F.C. players
North Shields F.C. players
English expatriates in Australia
Sheffield United F.C. players
Queens Park Rangers F.C. non-playing staff
Chelsea F.C. wartime guest players